Cold Hands is a studio album by the American punk blues band Boss Hog. It was released in 1990 through Amphetamine Reptile Records. Q Magazine described the album as "nine painfully slow nuggets of sonic indigestion"

Track listing

Personnel 
Boss Hog
 Cristina Martinez – vocals
 Charlie Ondras – drums
 Pete Shore – bass guitar
 Jon Spencer – vocals, guitar
 Jerry Teel – guitar
 Kurt Wolf – guitar

Production
 Steve Albini – production, mixing
 Peter Arsenault – mixing
 Ed Bair – mixing

References

External links
 

1990 debut albums
Boss Hog albums
Amphetamine Reptile Records albums
Albums produced by Steve Albini